A k-dron is an eleventh-degree polyhedron discovered by Janusz Kapusta in 1985. The name k-dron comes from the word dron, which in Greek means the wall, and k is the eleventh letter of the Latin alphabet.

History 
The shape was invented during the preparation for an exhibition by Janusz Kapusta and his colleague in a New York gallery. After printing the leaflets promoting the exhibition, which featured the image of two squares typed one in the other, Janusz Kapusta fell into the spatial form, on the basis of which he then made a spatial model of the solid.

The k-dron consists of a k-dron surface, which is a rhombus with attached right triangles and a square base. Two k-drons placed tops together forms a cube. Professor Janusz Łysko (Widener University in Pennsylvania ) gave the pattern features two variables that graphs the upper surface of a k-dron within the bounds of −1 ≤ x ≤ 1 and −1 ≤ y ≤ 1, namely:

 

K-dron systems can be arranged a great many different ways, creating a great variety of light and shadow patterns. As the angle of incidence changes, new patterns are created.

It is used for the design of façades of buildings, toys, games, jewelry, and even car hoods. There are an extreme variety of applications for this body – Janusz Kapusta described 50 applications in his book, and in April 2001 he stated he already found 168.

In 2009 the k-dron monument was erected before the building of the county seat in Koło.

References

External links 
 A site dedicated to the k-dron figure
 A film dedicated to the figure

Solids